Usue Maitane Arconada and Claire Liu were the defending champions, however Arconada was no longer eligible to participate in junior events. Liu partnered Taylor Johnson, but lost in the quarterfinals to María José Portillo Ramírez and Sofia Sewing.

Olga Danilović and Kaja Juvan won the title, defeating Caty McNally and Whitney Osuigwe in the final, 6–4, 6–3.

Seeds

Draw

Finals

Top half

Bottom half

External links 
 Draw

Girls' Doubles
Wimbledon Championship by year – Girls' doubles